Adnan Menderes Boulevard is a major avenue in Mersin, Turkey. It is named after Adnan Menderes (1899-1961), the prime minister of Turkey between 1950 and 1960.

Geography
While İsmet İnönü Boulevard continues to northwest Adnan Menderes Boulevard runs to west and south east. The area is used for recreation by residents of Mersin. Many coffeehouses as well as parks designed by various football clubs are situated at this recreational area. The Mersin Marina is also situated within this area. The biggest mosque in Mersin, the Muğdat Mosque, Mersin Naval Museum, a number of public schools and a part of Mersin University are on the north side of the boulevard.

2013 Mediterranean Games

The constant altitude boulevard, without any pronounced curves provides an ideal racecourse for races. At the 2013 Mediterranean Games, both the cycling and the half marathon events were held on Adnan Menderes Boulevard.

References

External links
Wowturkey page for images

Streets in Mersin
Sports venues in Mersin
Adnan Menderes
2013 Mediterranean Games venues